The 2018 Davidson Wildcats football team represented Davidson College in the 2018 NCAA Division I FCS football season. They were led by first-year head coach Scott Abell and played their home games at Richardson Stadium. They were members of the Pioneer Football League (PFL). They finished the season 6–5, 3–5 in PFL play to finish in sixth place. Davidson finished 2018 ranked #1 in the FCS for total offense, averaging 561.9 yards per game.

Previous season
The Wildcats finished the 2017 season 2–9, 0–8 in PFL play to finish in last place.

On November 27, head coach Paul Nichols was fired. He finished at Davidson with a five-year record of 7–43.

Preseason

Preseason All-PFL team
The PFL released their preseason all-PFL team on July 30, 2018, with the Wildcats having one player selected.

Offense

Wesley Dugger – RB

Preseason coaches poll
The PFL released their preseason coaches poll on July 31, 2018, with the Wildcats predicted to finish in last place.

Schedule

Source: Schedule

Game summaries

Brevard

Chowan

Guilford

at Dayton

at Valparaiso

Jacksonville

Morehead State

at Marist

Stetson

at San Diego

Butler

References

Davidson
Davidson Wildcats football seasons
Davidson Wildcats football